Pasqualino Cammarata, Frigate Captain (Italian: Pasqualino Cammarata... capitano di fregata) is a 1974 Italian-Spanish comedy film directed by Mario Amendola and starring Aldo Giuffrè, Agata Flori and Ninetto Davoli.

The film's sets were designed by the art director Adolfo Cofiño.

Cast
 Aldo Giuffrè as Pasqualino Cammarata 
 Agata Flori as Dolores 
 Ninetto Davoli as Otello Meniconi 
 Tano Cimarosa as Patanò 
 José Sacristán as Gianni Cuocolo 
 Ágata Lys as Novella Ferraris 
 Stefano Amato as Stefano Peluso 
 Mario Carotenuto as Ammiraglio Santi
 Ricardo Palacios
 Lara Sanders
 Manuel de Benito
 Leonardo Scavino
 Lucia Modugno
 Renato Baldini
 Iwao Yoshioka
 Luigi Bonos
 Sergio Bianchini
 José Jaspe
 Dante Cleri
 Luigi Antonio Guerra
 Maria Desta Birrù
 Lucia Righi
 Carla Mancini as Gypsie 
 Sal Borgese

References

Bibliography 
 Poppi, Roberto. I registi: dal 1930 ai giorni nostri. Gremese Editore, 2002.

External links 
 

1974 films
Italian comedy films
Spanish comedy films
1974 comedy films
1970s Italian-language films
Films directed by Mario Amendola
Films with screenplays by Mario Amendola
1970s Italian films